Luiz Duarte da Rocha (born 29 February 1956) is a Brazilian playwright and director, and singer/songwriter.  He was one of the creators of the Movimento do Disco Independente (Independent Records Movement) in 1979.

Career
Duarte was born in Rio de Janeiro.
He recorded two albums, but stopped recording in 1984 for 20 years before returning with a show titled “Caetaneando”.  As an author, in 1988 he won the Jabuti Award for his book Irmão Grimm, Irmão Grimm.

Awards

He has received more than 16 awards and 63 nominations, including, for three times, the Prêmio Mambembe de Teatro - the most important theater award in Brazil -, and Prêmio Jabuti, the most important book award in Brazil.

Main Theater Plays

 Adults: As Deusas de Cameron, As Larvas, Atrizes de Ouro, Canto e Briga na Terra Santa, Contos do Alquimista, Escrava Anastácia.
 Youth: Anathron, Dom Quixote - Figuras da Triste Figura

For children
A Caixa de Cristal; A Feiticeira, o Ogro e o Soldado; A Floresta Mágica; A Fuga do Planeta Kiltran; As Incríveis Mulheres do Dr. Kynoba; Cinderela Chinesa; Irmão Grimm, Irmão Grimm.

Main Awards
Prêmio Jabuti de Literatura (Jabuti Award, Literature) - the book Irmão Grimm, Irmão Grimm (1988)
Prêmio INACEM 1987-RJ - 5 best plays in the year
Prêmio MinC - Troféu Mambembe 1987 - best new playwright and director
Prêmio ESTÍMULO-S.C. São Paulo - 1988 - Anathron - best play - One of the 10 best productions of the 1980s, by the newspaper Estado de São Paulo.
Prêmio Nacional de Dramaturgia sobre a Questão do Negro – FUNDACEN/1988 - with Escrava Anastácia
Prêmio MinC - Troféu Mambembe 1988 - best production
Prêmio MinC - Troféu Mambembe 1989 - best playwright
Prêmio Coca-Cola de Teatro Para a Juventude - 1989 - best playwright

References

External links
 Luiz Duarte's website

1956 births
Living people
Brazilian writers